Carmen Gloria Aravena Acuña (born 6 January 1967) is a Chilean politician who serves as a member of the Senate of Chile.

References

External links
 BCN Profile

1967 births
Living people
University of La Frontera alumni
Temuco Catholic University alumni
Evópoli politicians
Senators of the LV Legislative Period of the National Congress of Chile
Senators of the LVI Legislative Period of the National Congress of Chile